Arphic Technology Co., Ltd. (aka.: Arphic Technology (文鼎科技)) is a type foundry based in Taiwan (Republic of China), founded in May 1990.

Fonts

Arphic PL Fonts

Arphic Technology is the creator of the Arphic PL Fonts (where "PL" means "public license(d)", in Chinese: 文鼎公眾授權字型 or 文鼎自由字型), including AR PL KaitiM Big5 (文鼎 PL 中楷), AR PL Mingti2L Big5 (文鼎 PL 細上海宋), AR PL SungtiL GB (文鼎 PL 簡報宋) and AR PL KaitiM GB (文鼎 PL 簡中楷), which were released in 1999 under the Arphic Public License.  They are used by Debian-derived Linux distributions (such as Ubuntu), as well as by most LaTeX distributions, as part of their default CJK fonts.

In 2010, Arphic Technology released another two fonts, AR PL MingU20-L (文鼎 PL 明體) and AR PL BaoSong2GBK (文鼎 PL 報宋), which are available under a revised Arphic Public License that restricts distribution of the fonts to non-profit use only.

Meiryo
As a partner of C&G Inc., Arphic Technology was one of the designers of kanji in C&G's Meiryo (明瞭) font, intended for Japanese.

Arphic Public License

The "Arphic Public License" published by Arphic Technology in 1999 was recognized by Free Software Foundation as a copyleft, free software license and incompatible with the GNU General Public License. But as it is used almost only for fonts, the incompatibility does not cause a problem in that use.

The revised Arphic Public License published in 2010 doesn't allow commercial use, thus is non-free.

See also
 List of CJK fonts
 List of companies of Taiwan

References

External links
 Arphic Public License (1999 free version)
 Arphic Public License (2010 non-commercial version)

Commercial type foundries
Taiwanese brands
Companies based in New Taipei
Manufacturing companies established in 1990
Taiwanese companies established in 1990